Calguia rufobrunnealis is a species of snout moth in the genus Calguia. It was described by Hiroshi Yamanaka in 2006. It is found in Japan (it was described from Okinawa).

References

 (2006). "Descriptions of four new species of the subfamily Phycitinae (Pyralidae) from Japan". Tinea. 19 (3): 180-187.

Moths described in 2006
Endemic fauna of Japan
Phycitini
Moths of Japan